The 2021 Cleveland Open was a professional tennis tournament played on hard courts. It was the third edition of the tournament which was part of the 2021 ATP Challenger Tour. It took place in Cleveland, Ohio, United States between 15 and 21 March 2021.

Singles main-draw entrants

Seeds

 1 Rankings are as of 8 March 2021.

Other entrants
The following players received wildcards into the singles main draw:
  Liam Draxl
  Roy Smith
  Zachary Svajda

The following players received entry into the singles main draw as alternates:
  Lucas Catarina
  Evan King
  Nicolás Mejía

The following players received entry from the qualifying draw:
  Felix Corwin
  Alexis Galarneau
  Aleksandar Kovacevic
  Evan Song

Champions

Singles

 Bjorn Fratangelo def.  Jenson Brooksby 7–5, 6–4.

Doubles

 Robert Galloway /  Alex Lawson def.  Evan King /  Hunter Reese 7–5, 6–7(5–7), [11–9].

References

2021 ATP Challenger Tour
2021 in American tennis
2021 in sports in Ohio
March 2021 sports events in the United States
2020s in Cleveland
Tennis in Cleveland